The 2010 Kentucky Wildcats football team represented the University of Kentucky during the 2010 NCAA Division I FBS football season. The Wildcats, led by first-year head coach Joker Phillips, competed in the Eastern Division of the Southeastern Conference and played their home games at Commonwealth Stadium. They finished the season 6–7, 2–6 in SEC play and were invited to the BBVA Compass Bowl where they were defeated by Pittsburgh 10–27.

Schedule

Game summaries

Louisville

Western Kentucky

Akron

Florida

Ole Miss

Auburn

South Carolina

Georgia

Mississippi State

Charleston Southern

Vanderbilt

Tennessee

BBVA Compass Bowl

Statistics

Team

Scores by quarter

Offense

Rushing

Passing

Receiving

Defense

Special teams

Starters per game
Offense

Defense

Personnel

Coaching staff

Roster

Depth chart
Vanderbilt game, November 8, 2010

Class of 2011 commitments

References

Kentucky
Kentucky Wildcats football seasons
Kentucky Wildcats football